John Lowther, 1st Viscount Lonsdale, PC FRS (25 April 165510 July 1700), known as Sir John Lowther, 2nd Baronet, from 1675 to 1696, was an English politician.

Early life
He was born at Hackthorpe Hall, Lowther, Westmorland, the son of Col. John Lowther of Lowther (the eldest son of Sir John Lowther, 1st Baronet) and his wife, Elizabeth Bellingham, daughter of Sir Henry Bellingham, 1st Baronet, of Hilsington, Westmoreland.

He was educated at Sedbergh School before admission to Queen's College, Oxford, where he matriculated in 1670. He was admitted to the Inner Temple in 1671 and called to the Bar in 1677.

Career
Prior to his creation as a viscount in 1696, Lowther had succeeded his grandfather as a baronet, and was twice member of parliament for Westmorland between 1677 and 1696. In 1688 he was serviceable in securing Cumberland and Westmorland for King William III, and was appointed to the Privy Council in 1689. In 1690, he was first lord of the treasury, and he was Lord Privy Seal from March 1699 until his death. He was badly injured in a duel in 1691.

Lonsdale wrote in 1688 a brief account of events from the accession of James II to the landing of the Prince of Orange at Torbay, which was later printed as Memoirs of the Reign of James II (in 1808, for private circulation) and again in 1857. The Memoirs reveal no more of Lonsdale's part in events than his public utterances.

Personal life
On 3 December 1674, he married Lady Katherine Thynne (1653–1712/3), sister of Thomas Thynne, 1st Viscount Weymouth, and second daughter of Sir Henry Frederick Thynne, 1st Baronet and the former Hon. Mary Coventry (second daughter, by his second wife, of Thomas Coventry, 1st Baron Coventry). Together, they were the parents of:

 Richard Lowther, 2nd Viscount Lonsdale (1692–1713), who died a few months after reaching his majority in 1713.
 Henry Lowther, 3rd Viscount Lonsdale (1694–1751), who died unmarried in 1751.
 Hon. Mary Lowther (–1706), who married Sir John Wentworth, 1st Baronet of North Elmsall in February 1692.
 Hon. Elizabeth Lowther, who married Sir William Ramsden, 2nd Baronet on 6 August 1695.
 Hon. Margaret Lowther (d. 1728), who married Sir Joseph Pennington, 2nd Baronet on 20 April 1706.
 Hon. Barbara Lowther (d. 1716), who married Thomas Howard of Corby (d. 1740), a direct descendant of Lord William Howard.
 Hon. Anthony Lowther (d. 1741)
 Hon. Jane Lowther (d. 1752), who died unmarried.

He died at Lowther on 10 July 1700 and was buried in Lowther churchyard. His wife Katherine Lowther took over his political influence and she was eventually buried at Lowther in 1713. The tomb is by William Stanton.

His branch of the Lowther family became extinct when his son Henry, the 3rd viscount, died unmarried in March 1751, and the baronetcy and estates went to his cousin, James Lowther, later the first Earl of Lonsdale.

References

External links

|-

1655 births
1700 deaths
People from Westmorland
Fellows of the Royal Society
Lord-Lieutenants of Cumberland
Lord-Lieutenants of Westmorland
Lords Privy Seal
Members of the Privy Council of England
John
English MPs 1661–1679
English MPs 1679
English duellists
English MPs 1681
English MPs 1685–1687
English MPs 1689–1690
English MPs 1690–1695
English MPs 1695–1698
1
Peers of England created by William III